Crack Attack may refer to:

Music
Crack Attack, a 1987 12" EP by Big Stick
"Crack Attack", a 1989 song by Grace Jones from the album Bulletproof Heart
"Crack Attack", a 1998 song by Rocket from the Crypt from the Break It Up EP
"The Crack Attack", a 1998 song by Fat Joe from the album Don Cartagena
"Say No Brother (Crack Attack Don't Do It)", a 1980s anti-drug single by Boogie Down Productions on B-Boy Records

Other
Crack Attack, a 2015 game by Kuju Entertainment